The 1912 United States presidential election in Kansas took place on November 5, 1912, as part of the 1912 United States presidential election. Voters chose ten representatives, or electors, to the Electoral College, who voted for president and vice president.

Kansas was won by Princeton University President Woodrow Wilson (D–New Jersey), running with governor of Indiana Thomas R. Marshall, with 39.30 percent of the popular vote, against the 26th president of the United States Theodore Roosevelt (I–New York), running with governor of California Hiram Johnson, with 32.88 percent of the popular vote, the 27th president of the United States William Howard Taft (R–Ohio), running with Columbia University President Nicholas Murray Butler, with 20.47 percent of the popular vote and the five-time candidate of the Socialist Party of America for President of the United States Eugene V. Debs (S–Indiana), running with the first Socialist mayor of a major city in the United States Emil Seidel, with 7.33 percent of the popular vote.

As a result of his win in the state, Wilson became the second Democratic presidential candidate to ever win Kansas as well as the first one since William Jennings Bryan in 1896. 

This is the only election when heavily Yankee Brown County has voted for a Democratic presidential candidate, and also the only election until 2020 when Riley County – another heavily Yankee county in the Dissected Till Plains of northeastern Kansas – has not supported the official Republican nominee. This election marks the last time four different candidates won at least one county within one individual state. This feat would be shared by North Dakota in the same election.

Results

Results by county

See also
 United States presidential elections in Kansas

Notes

References

Kansas
1912
1912 Kansas elections